Peter Nellies (24 April 1886 – 15 July 1930) was a Scottish footballer, who played for Heart of Midlothian (where he played before, during and after World War I while also working in a reserved occupation as a coal miner during the conflict, and is ranked 8th on the club's all-time appearances list in the Scottish Football League), King's Park and Carlisle United.

He gained two caps for the Scotland national team (one as captain) and was selected nine times for the Scottish League XI, and was also manager of Berwick Rangers.

Nellies's sister married footballer Willie Cringan; the brothers-in-law played together once for the Scottish League XI in 1919.

See also
List of Scotland national football team captains
List of Scotland wartime international footballers

References

Sources

External links

London Hearts profile (Scotland)
London Hearts profile (Scottish League)

1886 births
1930 deaths
Scottish footballers
Scotland international footballers
Heart of Midlothian F.C. players
King's Park F.C. players
Scottish Football League players
Scottish Football League representative players
Scottish football managers
Berwick Rangers F.C. managers
Association football fullbacks
Association football wing halves
Scotland wartime international footballers
Scotland junior international footballers
Douglas Water Thistle F.C. players
Scottish Junior Football Association players
Road incident deaths in Scotland
Association football player-managers
Carlisle United F.C. players
Scottish miners